The 131st Battalion, CEF was a unit in the Canadian Expeditionary Force during the First World War.  Based in New Westminster, British Columbia, the unit began recruiting in late 1915 in that city.  After sailing to England in November 1916, the battalion was absorbed into the 30th Battalion, CEF on November 14, 1916.  The 131st Battalion, CEF had one Officer Commanding: Lieut-Col. James Davis Taylor.

The battalion is perpetuated by the Royal Westminster Regiment.

References
 Meek, John F. Over the Top! The Canadian Infantry in the First World War. Orangeville, Ont.: The Author, 1971.

External links
 131st Overseas Battalion 1916 - contains pictures and names of officers and men before departure from British Columbia

Battalions of the Canadian Expeditionary Force
Organizations based in British Columbia
New Westminster
Royal Westminster Regiment